The Diocese of Ruaha is a central diocese in the Anglican Church of Tanzania: its current bishop is the Rt Rev Joseph Mgomi.

Notes

Anglican Church of Tanzania dioceses
Anglican bishops of Ruaha
Iringa Region
Morogoro